The Samish are a Native American people who live in the U.S. state of Washington. They are a Central Coast Salish people. Through the years, they were assigned to reservations dominated by other Tribes, for instance, the Swinomish Indians of the Swinomish Reservation of Washington and the Tulalip Tribes of the Tulalip Reservation. They are also enrolled in the Samish Indian Nation, formerly known as the Samish Indian Tribe, which regained federal recognition in 1996.

Name

History

Pre-Contact with Europeans
The Samish fished in the islands and channels off the coast of Skagit County, Washington. The Samish had villages on Samish, Guemes, and Fidalgo Islands, and fished and harvested resources there and in the San Juan Islands. In 1847, Samish had more than 2,000 members. Epidemics of measles, smallpox, and ague, and attacks from Haida and Tsimshian from the north diminished the population to approximately 150 members in one village by 1855, at the time of the signing of the Point Elliott Treaty. After the Treaty, some Samish moved to the Swinomish or Lummi reservations.

Post-Contact with Europeans
Though 113 Samish were present at the treaty negotiations and signing, no Samish signed the Point Elliott Treaty. The Samish were attached to the treaty by the signature of the Lummi chief Chow-its-hoot. Lacking a reservation of their own, many Samish were sent to live on the reservations of the Lummi or the Swinomish.

However, many Samish refused to go to the reservations and stayed in their traditional territory. They were often confused with the Skagit, and when they went to the Swinomish Reservation, they received only six household land allotments for the entire Tribe.

Many members went to Guemes Island to establish New Guemes (now referred to as "Potlatch Beach"), where they built a longhouse that housed more than 100 people. By 1912, the Samish had either moved onto the Swinomish Reservation or into other communities. They had been pushed off the island by white settlers, as the Samish had occupied the land with the only fresh water.

In 1926, a formal constitution was written by the Samish. They later altered it, but included a plan for electoral government. In 1971, in settlement of their land claim against the federal government, the Tribe was awarded US$5,754.96 for lands taken by the Point Elliott Treaty. The judgment deemed that they had exclusively occupied  of land at the time of the treaty.

In 1996, the Samish were officially re-recognized by the U.S. government. In 1998, they changed their official name to the Samish Indian Nation.

Language
The Samish language is a dialect of the Northern Straits Salish (Lkungen) language; a close sister language is Southern Straits Salish (Clallam or Klallam.  Both are in the Central Coast Salish branch of Coast Salish, itself a branch of the large Salish(an) language family (Tim Montler 1999: "Language and dialect variation in Straits Salishan". Anthropological Linguistics 41 (4): 462–502, Kuipers, Aert H. Salish Etymological Dictionary. Missoula, MT: Linguistics Laboratory, University of Montana, 2002. )  Coast Salish.

In 1990, the Canadian Museum of Civilization  published A Phonology, Morphology, and Classified Word List for the Samish Dialect of Straits Salish, by Brent D. Galloway (Canadian Ethnology Service, Mercury Series Paper #116).  This is the first grammatical sketch and extensive word list for the Samish dialect; it was based on linguistic field work by Galloway with the last-known remaining speakers.  Galloway's recorded tapes are on file with the Museum of Civilization and the Samish Nation. Three or four fluent or partially fluent speakers remain as of 2013.

See also 
Sammamish

Notes

External links
Samish Indian Nation, official website
Samish history from the Samish Indian Nation Cultural Department

Coast Salish
Native American tribes in Washington (state)